Suzanne Jeskewitz (born February 21, 1942) is a former Wisconsin legislator and politician.

Born in Galesville, Wisconsin, Jeskewitz graduated from Gale-Ettrick High School and then received her bachelor's degree from University of Wisconsin–La Crosse. She was in public relations, teaching, and a real estate broker. Jeskewitz served on the Waukesha County, Wisconsin Board of Supervisors from 1992 to 1996. She was then elected to the Wisconsin State Assembly in 1996, as a Republican. Jeskewitz served from 1996 until her retirement in 2009.

Notes

People from Galesville, Wisconsin
University of Wisconsin–La Crosse alumni
Businesspeople from Wisconsin
County supervisors in Wisconsin
Republican Party members of the Wisconsin State Assembly
Women state legislators in Wisconsin
1942 births
Living people
21st-century American politicians
21st-century American women politicians
People from Waukesha County, Wisconsin